Raise the Alarm may refer to:

Raise the Alarm (album)
Raise the Alarm (song) The Living End
"Raise the Alarm", song by Air Cuba (band)